Thomas Kreider "Tom" Ray (May 24, 1934 - February 6, 2018) was the ninth bishop of the Episcopal Diocese of Northern Michigan.

Early life and education
Ray was born on May 24, 1934, in Barberton, Ohio. He studied at the University of Michigan, where he met his future wife Brenda Lee Ackerman and who married in 1959. An also attended the General Theological Seminary, and graduated in 1959. He was awarded a Doctor of Divinity from the General Theological Seminary in 1984.

Ordained Ministry and Bishop
Ray was ordained deacon on June 20, 1959, by Bishop Benjamin M. Washburn and priest on December 23, 1959, by Bishop Francis Lickfield. He served as canon at St Mark's Cathedral in Grand Rapids, Michigan, Crown Point, Indiana, and Gethsemane Church in Marion, Indiana. In 1971 he became rector of St Luke's Church in Evanston, Illinois. Ray was elected Bishop of Northern Michigan on the second ballot on February 6, 1982, during a special diocesan convention. He was consecrated on August 21, 1982. He was an advocate of women's rights, gay rights, and Mutual Ministry. He retired in 1999. Ray died on February 6, 2018, at the age of 83, three days after his wife's death.

References

External links 
Ray Consecrated In Northern Michigan

2018 deaths
General Theological Seminary alumni
People from Barberton, Ohio
1934 births
20th-century American Episcopalians
Episcopal bishops of Northern Michigan